The following is a list of exercises of the Indian Air Force.

References 

India aviation-related lists
Indian Air Force
Indian military exercises
Indian military-related lists